Leven Powell (1737August 23, 1810) was a Virginia planter, merchant, Continental Army officer and Federalist politician who served several terms in the Virginia House of Delegates as well as in the Virginia Ratification Convention representing Loudoun County, and one term as a United States representative for Virginia's 17th congressional district.

Early and family life
Leven Powell was born near Haymarket in Prince William County in the Colony of Virginia.to the former Eleanor Peyton (daughter of prominent planter and burgess Valentine Peyton), and her ship captain and planter husband William Powell (circa 1705–1787). Powell's ship worked in the coastal trade and he moved from Somerset County, Maryland to Dumfries circa 1734, then also invested in land in Prince William and Loudoun counties before becoming a commissary furnishing beef to the patriot forces in the American Revolutionary War. Both parents could trace their descent from the First Families of Virginia. As was customary for his class, Leven received a private education.

Powell married Sarah (Sally) Harrison (1742–1812), the daughter of local planter Burr Harrison, who like Leven Powell would serve in the American Revolutionary War. The couple had several children, including William Harrison Powell (1766-) and Leven Powell, Jr.(1772-, who remained in Loudoun county as a planter. Their sons Burr Powell (1768- ), Cuthbert Powell (1774- ) and Albert Harrison Powell (1781- ) became lawyers as well as followed their father's political career path—lawyer Burr Powell remained in Middleburg and served in both houses of the Virginia General Assembly, and his brother Cuthbert became mayor of Alexandria as well as a U.S. Congressman.

Career
Powell began his public career deputy sheriff of Prince William County under his uncle Col. Henry Peyton.

However, Powell (like his father, Col. Peyton and his many cousins) primarily supported his family as a planter. He purchased 500 acres in newly formed Loudoun County and moved there in 1763, shortly after marrying his wife, Sally, whose planter father Burr Harrison owned a large estate further upstream along the Potomac River. Powell built a home he called "the Shades", as well as the first flour mill in the area. Over time, he came to operate what became five plantations totaling 1800 acres using enslaved labor. Powell owned 22 slaves, 18 horses, 24 cattle and a 2-wheeled carriage in 1787. He (or his son of the same name) owned 13 slaves in 1810, the year Powell died visiting a health spring in Pennsylvania. Powell also operated a store, and at some point purchased a mill on Hungry Run, which he named "Sally Mill" after his wife.

Military officer

As relations with Great Britain worsened in the years before the American Revolutionary War, Powell served on the 15-member Loudoun County Committee of Safety in 1774. In either 1774 or 1775 he accepted a commission as major in a company of Loudoun County minutemen that traveled to southeastern Virginia, where they harassed Lord Dunmore's troops in Norfolk and Hampton and were ultimately incorporated into the Continental Army. In January 1777, General Washington promoted Powell to lieutenant colonel of the 16th Continental Regiment. He fought at the Battle of Long Island, Battle of Brandywine and the Battle of Monmouth. However, health complications due to the harsh winter encampment at Valley Forge (which nearly caused him to lose an eye) led Powell to resign in 1778, although the Virginia General Assembly would later vote him a full share of land for his service.

Three of his brothers also served with the Continental Army: Dr. John Thomas Powell (1745–1807) served as a surgeon, then returned to Dumfries. Lt. William Powell III (1745–1807) served three years under Lt. Col. Daniel Morgan, and the youngest brother Lt. John Payton Powell (1760–1844) also served in Morgan's 11th Virginia Regiment (renamed the 7th Virginia Regiment in 1779), then received land and moved westward—first to Hardeman County, Tennessee and eventually died in Madison County, Alabama.

Politician
A local historian noted Powell's transition from military hero to politician and considered Powell the county's leading Federalist from the 1780s until the early 1800s, when Charles F. Mercer became prominent as a supporter of turnpikes.

Powell first won election to the Virginia House of Delegates in 1779, representing Loudoun County (part-time) alongside his cousin, veteran Francis Peyton. However, Peyton chose to become the new county's land commissioner and Powell the land office's deputy register, so one of them resigned and the other served alongside Col. Josiah Clapham in that legislative session. Powell definitely served alongside Col. Clapham in the session beginning October 15, 1787, then won re-election (but served alongside Richard Bland Lee) in the 1788 session. Powell also won election as one of Loudoun County's delegates to the Virginia ratification convention in 1788, this time alongside Stevens Thomson Mason, who unlike Powell but like his uncle George Mason voted against ratification. However, Powell did not again win election to the House of Delegates until 1791, when he served alongside Albert Russell, who had represented the county alongside bridgebuilder William Gunnell during the previous two sessions, then Powell won re-election and served alongside Joseph Lane.

Powell also helped found two towns in Loudoun County. The most important of them was Middleburg, on his land at the junction of the Alexandria to Winchester turnpike (now part of U.S. Route 50) and the road between the Loudoun county seat (Leesburg) and the Fauquier county seat (Warrenton). Powell had purchased 50 acres from Joseph Chinn (who in 1728 had built Chinn's Ordinary, now called the Red Fox Inn, near the center of that 50 acre parcel). The area had been called "Chinn's Crossroads", and became known as "Powell Town". The Virginia legislature incorporated the town in 1787, with nonresidents (but landowners and political veterans) Francis Peyton, William Bronaugh, William Heale, John P. Harrison, Burr Harrison, Josiah Clapham and Richard Bland Lee as trustees.

Powell collected ground rent but declined to have the town named after him, so it became "Middleburgh" (later shortened). In 1801 the Fairfax and Loudoun Turnpike Company of which Powell was a director was superseded by the Little River Turnpike Company (in which Mercer was prominent). Meanwhile, in 1790, Powell was one of the founding trustees of Matildaville, which was promoted by Lighthorse Harry Lee (Virginia's governor 1791–1795). Although the town did not become the new federal capital city as Lee had hoped, Matildaville became the headquarters of the Patowmack Company, which built a series of canals and locks to circumvent the falls of the Potomac River by 1802, but which never achieved financial success and was by 1828 subsumed in the Chesapeake and Ohio Canal Company.

Powell founded the Federalist Party in Loudoun County.  In the 1796 presidential election, Powell stood alone among Virginia's 21 electors in voting for John Adams over Thomas Jefferson. Voters also elected Powell as a Federalist to the Sixth Congress (March 4, 1799 – March 3, 1801).

Death and legacy
Powell died visiting health springs in Bedford, Pennsylvania in 1810, and was buried there in the Old Presbyterian Graveyard. His widow, who remained in Loudon County, survived him by two years. His birthplace, now known as the Powell-Allen House, was placed on the National Register of Historic Places in 1976.

References

Images of America Middleburg, link to Google Books preview page 7, viewed September 30, 2012

External links

1737 births
1810 deaths
People from Manassas, Virginia
Continental Army officers from Virginia
Federalist Party members of the United States House of Representatives from Virginia
18th-century American politicians
American city founders
People from Middleburg, Virginia